Topla is a village in the municipality of Bor, Serbia. According to the 2002 census, the village has a population of 100 people. Whereas in 2011 population schrinked to 97 people.

References

Populated places in Bor District